Shahrak-e Hezarani (also Romanized as Shahrak-e Hezārānī; also known as Hezārānī) is a village in Cham Kabud Rural District, Sarab Bagh District, Abdanan County, Ilam Province, Iran. At the 2006 census, its population was 3,098, in 665 families.

Demographics 
The village is populated by Kurds  and Lurs.

References 

Populated places in Abdanan County
Kurdish settlements in Ilam Province